The Living Monolith (Ahmet Abdol) is a supervillain appearing in American comic books published by Marvel Comics. He first appeared in The X-Men #54 (March 1969).

Abdol is the Living Pharaoh while in his normal appearance, but once he obtained enough cosmic energy, he would increase in mass, size, and power, thus becoming the Living Monolith.

Abdol has mainly been an X-Men villain, usually using Havok to become the Living Monolith. He has also used other superheroes, including the Fantastic Four (who gained their super powers from exposure to cosmic rays). He even killed his own daughter to achieve his goal.

Fictional character biography
Ahmet Abdol was born in Cairo, Egypt.  He was a professor of Egyptology and archeologist who discovered he had the ability to manipulate cosmic energy, mainly by absorbing it and projecting it as energy blasts. Deciding to use his powers for his own personal gain, Abdol created a cult around himself as the messiah, the Cult of the Living Pharaoh, became a supervillain and set about his plan to rule the world.

Abdol discovered that another mutant, Havok (Alex Summers, brother to Scott Summers also known as Cyclops) could absorb and project cosmic energy more easily than Abdol could. Abdol kidnapped Havok and used him to increase his power, and battled the X-Men. He then first became the Living Monolith, and battled the X-Men in this form. He was then captured by the Sentinels, but escaped.

Abdol later stole the ruby scarab and battled the Living Mummy. He later abducted Havok again. As the Living Monolith, he battled Spider-Man and Thor. Later, using the Cheops Crystal, he became the Living Monolith again. He battled Luke Cage, Iron Fist, Cyclops, Storm, and Nightcrawler.

Later, Abdol abducted Mister Fantastic, the Invisible Woman, and the Human Torch to absorb cosmic radiation from their bodies. As he grew, he battled the Avengers and Spider-Man. Eventually Abdol grew so large that Thor used his hammer to throw him into outer space, where the Living Monolith eventually became a "Living Planet," similar to Ego.

His relative, Leila O'Toole, also known as Plasma, joins the Cult of the Living Pharaoh and tries to capture Havok for the Living Pharaoh.

It was later revealed that, although the Monolith is usually the one pulling the strings, another X-Men villain, Apocalypse, wanted to use the Living Monolith to drain the powers of other super-beings. As a result, Abdol went on a rampage, and several superheroes attempted to stop him before he began to grow to planet size.

It was later revealed, also, that Abdol's formerly dormant mutant powers had been activated by a procedure performed on him by Mister Sinister. Sinister spliced certain x-genes from Alex Summers into his genome, thus giving Abdol the ability to absorb cosmic energy. Since his powers were modified to become genetically similar to Havok's, this explained why their abilities symbiotically interfered with one another's.

During his time in space, one of the Monolith's main weapons, the Staff of Horus, was acquired by a young woman called Akasha. She was able to use that power to become a female version of the Living Pharaoh. Spider-Man was able to break the staff, leaving Akasha to depart the scene retaining only some fragments of the Pharaoh's power.

Abdol was then found by Bishop and Deathbird floating in space. Deathbird revealed she'd been betraying Bishop for some time; it was later on revealed that she was in fact working for Apocalypse. She then knocked out Bishop and Abdol was brought to Apocalypse, who used Abdol's body as an energy container during The Twelve story arc. This led to Apocalypse's merging with Cyclops. The Monolith was seen breaking up because of the excess of power absorbed, and then fled.

When the Crimson Gem of Cyttorak reappears on Earth and sends out a call to individuals suitable to become a new Juggernaut, Abdol hears the call and makes his way to the Temple of Cyttorak. Amidst conflict between demonic guardians of the Gem, the X-Men, and several prospective and former candidates for the Juggernaut's power, Abdol manages to claim the Gem, which transforms him into a towering amalgam of Living Monolith and Juggernaut.  However, after a brief rampage, Abdol was depowered again when Cyttorak, answering a challenge from former Juggernauts Cain Marko and Piotr Rasputin, chose to return the power to Marko.

Powers and abilities
Ahmet Abdol, as the Living Pharaoh, is a mutant with the ability to absorb energy from cosmic rays. As the Living Monolith he had the ability to emit cosmic energy as blasts of concussive force from his eyes. Abdol could only utilize his mutant powers as the Living Monolith and could transform into the Living Monolith only when cosmic radiation was channeled into his body through a focusing medium, such as the Cheops Crystal, or when cosmic radiation was prevented from reaching his counterpart, Havok.

The Living Monolith has been genetically altered by splicing his own mutant genes with those of the mutant X-Man Havok. This modification allows him to absorb large amounts of cosmic radiation - although as Havok absorbs the same radiation, the Living Monolith's powers can be limited when Havok absorbs background radiation (or other suitable energy sources) that might otherwise be used to fuel the Living Monolith.

Although Havok projects absorbed radiation as energy blasts, the Living Monolith had a broader range of powers. He is able to project energy as intense heat, a concussive force, or sonic vibrations. Stored energy also affects his physical form - increasing his size, mass, and power, and granting him an indefinite lifespan. Although there appears to be no clear upper limit to the amount of power he can absorb, it is also possible to overload his powers.

The Living Monolith has additionally demonstrated telepathic abilities enabling him to read minds and take complete mental control over small crowds of people.

Abdol wore body armor of unknown materials. As the Living Pharaoh, he wielded a hand-held ankh capable of projecting bursts of concussive force.

Abdol has a gifted intellect, and is an expert archeologist and Egyptologist, with a Ph.D. in archeology. He is also an advance student of genealogy, human mutation, and the effects of cosmic radiation.

In other media
 Living Monolith appears as the boss of stage 6 in the 1992 Konami X-Men arcade game.
 Living Monolith made an appearance as a boss character in the video game X-Men Legends II: Rise of Apocalypse voiced by Dwight Schultz. He served as one of the final guards when reaching Apocalypse's lair in Egypt. Living Monolith has special dialogue with Sunfire.
 Both Living Pharaoh and Living Monolith are featured as bosses in the Facebook game Marvel: Avengers Alliance. He appears in the sixth Spec Ops where the S.H.I.E.L.D. Agent must work to prevent Living Pharaoh from becoming Living Monolith while fighting the Hellfire Club, the Brotherhood of Mutants, and Dragoness. He is also a regular enemy in the Season 2 missions, wherein the Hellfire Club and associated villains play a larger role.

References

External links
 
 
 ; a possible alternate future Living Monolith in the Guardians of the Galaxy universe

Characters created by Arnold Drake
Characters created by Don Heck
Comics characters introduced in 1969
Fictional archaeologists
Fictional characters who can change size
Fictional characters with absorption or parasitic abilities
Fictional characters with energy-manipulation abilities
Fictional characters with superhuman durability or invulnerability
Fictional cult leaders
Fictional Egyptian people
Fictional professors
Marvel Comics characters who have mental powers
Marvel Comics characters with superhuman strength
Marvel Comics mutants
Marvel Comics mutates
Marvel Comics supervillains
Marvel Comics telepaths
X-Men supporting characters